Juan Menéndez Pidal (1858, in Madrid – 1915) was a Spanish archivist, jurisconsult, historian, and poet, brother of Luis and Ramón Menéndez Pidal.  He was long a director of the Archivo Histórico Nacional at Madrid, and a director of the Revista de Archivos, Bibliotecas, y Museos.

Born in Madrid, he studied law until he obtained his title, and then devoted himself to journalism. His Dios y César, an ecclesiastical and legal study of the relation of church and state, attracted much attention.  In 1914 he was elected a member of the Spanish Royal Academy of the Language.

See also 
 List of archivists

References

External links
 

1861 births
1915 deaths
Writers from Madrid
Spanish people of Asturian descent
Members of the Congress of Deputies of the Spanish Restoration
Spanish archivists
19th-century Spanish historians
Spanish poets
Spanish male poets
Members of the Royal Spanish Academy